Souwar (Pictures) is the nineteenth album by Kathem Al Saher, released on 30 September 2008. Kathem El Saher anticipated album has finally been released.
The album is entitled “Souwar” (Pictures) and includes 13 songs that remarks an innovation and overlap in the music and the lyrical content.

In this album Kathem wrote and composed five songs, meanwhile he returned singing poems from the great poet archive Nizar Qabbani, added also to an Iraqi Folklore song.

Finally, Kathem recently shot the album's first music video in Australia under the direction of Rachel Abdullah and currently Rotana started airing the video.

Track listing

2008 albums
Arabic-language albums
Kadim Al Sahir albums
Rotana Records albums